Billy the Wizard: Rocket Broomstick Racing is a racing and platform game by developer and publisher Data Design Interactive. It was originally released on January 27, 2005 for the PlayStation 2 and Microsoft Windows in European territories, while the Wii version was released in 2007 in North America and Europe.

The game was originally announced under the title Barry Hatter: The Sorcerer's Broomstick, but this later changed to Billy the Wizard.

Gameplay
In the game, the player races alongside other wizards in the Broomstick Grand Prix. The game involves the player blasting opponents out of the sky with their magical powers, and collecting extra ammunition as they skim tree-tops and plunge under low bridges and archways.

The game has over 40 stages spread across 5 levels, with 8 playable characters to choose from.

There are a few other non-racing portions. The player can also try to collect books or try to take down a dragon by shooting it with magical powers.

Reception
IGN gave the game a 2.0/10, referencing its sub-par menus, presentation, controls, and gameplay as justification.

References

2006 video games
Data Design Interactive games
PlayStation 2 games
Racing video games
Video games developed in the United Kingdom
Wii games
Windows games
Conspiracy Entertainment games
Multiplayer and single-player video games
Video games about magic
Metro3D games